Charles Amherst Chase (January 10, 1864 – January 27, 1937) was an American tennis player active in the late 19th century.

A native of Chicago, he was the son of lawyer Samuel Blanchard Chase and Emma Thompson Chase, and the grandson of Milwaukee Mayor Horace Chase. He was named after his maternal grandfather, Amherst Thompson. He attended Lake View High School, Amherst College in Massachusetts and Northwestern University Law School in Illinois.

He was a top-notch baseball player at one point, catching pitches from the great Bob Caruthers, but gave it up to pursue tennis. He did not start playing the game until age 16, when he first saw a tennis outfit. He had never heard of the sport, but he and his brothers learned to play.

He was noticeably slight in his build, weighing only . In 1884, he won his first of five Western Championship titles. In 1885, he took second at the intercollegiate national championships, losing the final to Wallace P. Knapp of Yale. Chase reached the semifinals of the U.S. National Championships in 1886, and the quarterfinals in 1889 and 1890. In 1888, he won the Newcastle Wright & Ditson Tournament.

He moved to Superior, Wisconsin in 1893, and married Nelly Green the next year. After practicing law in Chicago, he became a prominent banker in Superior, where he was president of the Bank of Commerce for 30 years.

He was also very fond of golf, and was credited with introducing the sport to Superior, where he first played in vacant lots. He died in 1937.

References

External links 

1864 births
1937 deaths
American male tennis players
Lawyers from Chicago
Amherst College alumni
Northwestern University alumni
People from Superior, Wisconsin
Amherst Mammoths men's tennis players
Tennis players from Chicago